Roni may refer to:

 Roni, Jigawa, a local government area in Nigeria
 Roni (given name), including a list of people with the name
 "Roni" (song), a 1989 single by Bobby Brown
 Roni, the cursed persona of Regina Mills, the Evil Queen on season 7 of ABC's TV series, Once Upon A Time
 Roni (mascot), the mascot for the 1980 Winter Olympics in Lake Placid
 Coronavirus, especially related to the COVID-19 pandemic
 Roni (footballer born 1979), full name Roniéliton Pereira Santos, Brazilian football striker
 Roni (footballer, born November 1977), full name Ronielle Faria Gomes, Brazilian football midfielder
 Roni (footballer, born 1987), full name Roni Visnoveski Turola, Brazilian football goalkeeper
 Roni (footballer, born January 1991), full name Ronei Gleison Rodrigues dos Reis, Brazilian football attacking midfielder
 Roni (footballer, born June 1991), full name Ronieli Gomes dos Santos, Brazilian football forward
 Roni (footballer, born 1993), full name David González Gómez, Spanish football forward
 Roni (footballer, born 1995), full name Ronielson da Silva Barbosa, Brazilian football forward
 Roni (footballer, born 1999), full name Roni Medeiros de Moura, Brazilian football midfielder

See also
 
 Ron (disambiguation)
 Ronnie (disambiguation)
 Ronny
 Rony